Bédard or Bedard is a Franco-Canadian surname, with origins from France.
It may refer to:

 Claude Bédard (born 1952), translator
 Connor Bedard (born 2005), Canadian centreman in the Western Hockey League 
 David Bédard (born 1965), Canadian Olympic diver
 Denis Bédard (born 1950), Canadian composer and organist
 Éric Bédard (born 1976), Canadian Olympic speed skater
 Érik Bédard (born 1979), Canadian pitcher in Major League Baseball
 Georges Bédard, Canadian politician
 Irene Bedard (born 1967), American actress
 Jim Bedard (ice hockey b. 1927), (born 1927), Canadian defenceman in the National Hockey League
 Jim Bedard (ice hockey b. 1956), (born 1956), Canadian goalie in the National Hockey League
 Louise Bédard (born 1955), is a Canadian contemporary dance choreographer
 Marc-André Bédard (politician) (1935-2020), Canadian politician
 Marc-André Bédard (biathlete) (born 1986), Canadian biathlete
 Michael Bedard, Canadian novelist, b. 1949
 Myriam Bédard (born 1969), Canadian Olympic biathlete
 Patrick Bedard (born 1941), American racing journalist
 Pierre-Stanislas Bédard (1762–1829), Canadian lawyer, judge, journalist and political figure
 Robert Bédard (wrestler) (born 1932), Canadian professional wrestler
 Robert Bédard (tennis) (born 1931), Canadian tennis player
 Stéphane Bédard (born 1968), Canadian politician
 Tony Bedard, comic book writer

References

French-language surnames
Surnames of French origin